The Defence Intelligence Organisation (DIO) is an Australian government military intelligence agency responsible for strategic intelligence and technical intelligence assessments, advising defence and government decision-making on national security and international security issues, and the planning and conduct of Australian Defence Force operations. The DIO does not collect intelligence or conduct covert action, but  works on defence economics, transnational terrorism, and WMD.

The DIO is an agency of the Australian Intelligence Community and is part of the Defence Intelligence Group (DIG) with the Australian Geospatial-Intelligence Organisation (AGO). The head of DIO is the Director of the Defence Intelligence Organisation, currently Major General Matthew Hall.

History

Joint Intelligence Bureau 
In the post-World War II period, the military intelligence and strategic assessments functions were shared between the Navy, Army and Air Force intelligence directorates and the Joint Intelligence Bureau (JIB) from 1947 to 1969. JIB was responsible for geographic, infrastructure and economic intelligence – mainly in Australia's region. In 1957, JIB's responsibilities were expanded to include scientific and technical intelligence.

Joint Intelligence Organisation 

In 1969, most of the foreign assessment elements of the three armed services were merged to form the Joint Intelligence Organisation (JIO). The Royal Commission on Intelligence and Security (also called the first Hope Commission) in 1977 recommended the establishment of the Office of National Assessments (ONA) as an independent statutory agency to provide all-source assessments on international political, strategic and economic developments to the Prime Minister and to assume the foreign intelligence assessment role of JIO. JIO was then reoriented to focus more closely on defence intelligence and strategic interests. The second Hope Commission endorsed these arrangements in 1984. In 1989, counterterrorism was added to JIO's responsibilities.

Overview
A review of Defence intelligence in 1989 by Major General John Baker led to the establishment in 1990 of the Defence Intelligence Organisation (DIO) as the  sole strategic level, all-source intelligence assessment agency for the Department of Defence. Baker became the first Director of DIO in 1990 until 1992.

DIO is the strategic-level, all-source intelligence assessment agency for the Department of Defence. It is not an autonomous body; unlike ONA, DIO is a subordinate organisation within the Department of Defence with no separate statutory mandate or direct budget line. The organisation's character and purpose is defined by its position within the Defence portfolio.

DIO is an integrated civilian–military organisation, with the majority of staff being public servants recruited through either the defence graduate program or direct entry.

Operations 
DIO's assessments focus on the Asia-Pacific region and cover strategic, political, defence, military, economic, scientific and technical areas. DIO's intelligence products help inform decisions about Australia's military activities at home and abroad, defence acquisition processes, force readiness decisions, strategic policy, international relations and defence scientific developments.

DIO also maintains close links with intelligence agencies of other allied countries. In addition, it maintains links with intelligence agencies of a range of other countries to foster dialogue and the exchange of information and as a contribution to defence relationships with regional countries.

Australian troops deploying to Afghanistan and Iraq were briefed by DIO on enemy weapons and forces.

Directors 
The position of Director of the Defence Intelligence Organisation is a two-star rank position.

References

External links
DIO home page
About DIO
Open Australia Search: Parliamentary records mentioning DIO.

Australian intelligence agencies
Commonwealth Government agencies of Australia
1990 establishments in Australia
Government agencies established in 1990
Defence Strategic Policy and Intelligence Group